The girls' singles tournament of the 2017 Asian Junior Badminton Championships was held from 26 July to 30 July 2017. The defending champions of the last edition is Chen Yufei from China. Gregoria Mariska, Yeo Jia Min and Pattarasuda Chaiwan were the top 3 seeds in the tournament. Han Yue of China, the 4th seed, emerged as the champion after she beat 3rd seed Pattarasuda Chaiwan of Thailand in the finals with a score of 21–15, 21–13.

Seeded

  Gregoria Mariska (withdrew)
  Yeo Jia Min (semifinals)
  Pattarasuda Chaiwan (Finals)
  Han Yue (champion)
  Aakarshi Kashyap (quarterfinals)
  Chananchida Jucharoen (first round)
  Chasinee Korepap (third round)
  Sri Fatmawati (third round)

Draw

Finals

Top half

Section 1

Section 2

Bottom half

Section 3

Section 4

References

External links 
Main Draw

2017 Badminton Asia Junior Championships
Junior